Hiroshi Ishikawa (石川 寛, born May 18, 1963) is a Japanese film director and writer from Ōdate. He is best known for his 2005 film, Su-ki-da (2005). He won the Silver Iris for Best Director at the New Montreal Film Festival.

Filmography
 Tokyo.sora (2002)
 Su-ki-da (2005)
 Kimi no Yubisaki (Short Film) (2007)
 Petal Dance (2013)

References

External links

1963 births
Living people